Liverpool Central railway station in Liverpool, England, forms a central hub of the Merseyrail network, being on both the Northern Line and the Wirral Line. The station is located underground on two levels, below the site of a former mainline terminus. It is the busiest station in Liverpool, though considerably smaller than Lime Street station, the mainline terminus, and the busiest station to operate fully the Merseyrail network.  The station is the busiest underground station outside London serving 40,000 people daily. The station in passengers per platform is the busiest underground railway station in the United Kingdom at 5,217,547 per platform per annum and laying third in all stations, underground or overground.

Liverpool Central is one of nine stations on the Merseyrail network to incorporate automatic ticket gates. The main concourse is part of a shopping centre, and includes a closed subway link to the former Lewis's department store.

History

High Level terminal station

The original station, which was a large, above-ground terminal station, opened on 2 March 1874, at the end of the Cheshire Lines Committee (CLC) line to Manchester Central. It replaced Brunswick station as the CLC's Liverpool terminus, becoming the headquarters of the committee.

There were six platforms within the station, offering journeys to Manchester Central (in 45 minutes, making the route the quickest and most direct between Liverpool and Manchester), London St. Pancras, Hull, Harwich,  and an alternative London route to that of the Midland Railway, terminating at London Marylebone.

Until the nationalisation of Britain's railways, the station was always busy, but as with many other stations in the UK, it was closed under the Beeching Axe, as the routes served could be taken from nearby . These final services were withdrawn on 17 April 1972, with a promise to reinstate the Gateacre route when the Merseyrail network was completed in 1978.

The High Level station was demolished in 1973, having served a short time as a car park, although some former station buildings remained while work was in progress on rebuilding the underground station in the mid-1970s. The area of the train shed now forms the centre of the stalled Central Village development.

Underground urban station

Liverpool Central Low Level underground terminal station opened on 11 January 1892, at the end of the Mersey Railway's route, via the Mersey Railway Tunnel from Birkenhead, when the route was extended from James Street station. The Mersey Railway platforms were underground, accessed from stairs within the High Level station and situated in roughly the same position as the escalators accessing the Northern Line today.

The Mersey Railway tunnel entering Central Low Level from the north of the station was aligned with the High Level station's approach tunnel from the south. This was to ensure minimum engineering work if ever the two tunnels were to be linked up—as did occur in the 1970s.

Merseyrail
The Merseyrail network was created in the 1970s by merging separate railways into one integrated network. Central underground station would service the Northern and Wirral Lines.

A new loop tunnel was built in Liverpool city centre for Wirral Line trains, linking James Street station with Moorfields, Lime Street and Liverpool Central stations, and returning to James Street. A new deep-level underground platform was built at Liverpool Central as part of this loop tunnel.

The former CLC route was taken underground connecting to the underground Mersey Railway platforms. Another new tunnel, the Link Tunnel, allowed trains to continue northwards via  to the approach lines to Liverpool Exchange, creating one long line from Hunts Cross to Southport. Liverpool Exchange terminal station was closed in 1977; this route became the Northern Line. The rebuilt underground station was opened by British Rail in the same year.

Simultaneously, works to allow the Northern Line to be connected to the Victoria Tunnel, called the Edge Hill Spur, to connect the eastern section of the city to the city centre underground section were undertaken, then later abandoned. Trains would have operated from Central station to the east of the city and out to St Helens.

2012 refurbishment
It was announced in September 2011 that, through a £40 million investment from Network Rail, Liverpool Central was to have a major refurbishment programme to improve the concourse and platforms. Works included new lighting, flooring, new toilet facilities and new escalators to the Northern Line platforms. The entire station closed for refurbishment on 23 April 2012. The station partly reopened on 25 August 2012, with the refurbishment of the main concourse and Wirral Line platform completed. The station fully reopened on 22 October 2012 with the work on the Northern Line platforms completed.

Facilities 

A street-level travel centre opened in November 2009, replacing the former ticket office and newsagents; this sells tickets, newspapers, food and drink. There are also toilets, cash machines, free Wifi and food-vending machines. Escalators and lifts lead to the two Northern Line platforms and the deep-level Wirral Line platform. There are cycle racks for 30 cycles and secure storage for 16 cycles.

Future
The Liverpool City Region Long Term Rail Strategy document, produced by Merseytravel in 2014, states that it hopes to re-open the Wapping Tunnel to allow Liverpool Central to connect with Edge Hill and beyond. Merseytravel commissioned a feasibility study into a new rail link between Central and Edge Hill, which was completed in May 2016. The report found that the Wapping Tunnel was in good condition—though suffering from flooding in places and requiring some remedial work—and that the concept of re-opening the tunnel was viable.

Plans were developed in 2006 to build a shopping complex on the site of the car park behind the former High Level station (bounded by the rear of the station, Cropper Street, Newington and Bold Street). Known as Central Village, it was to consist of a high-rise tower for residential and business use, retail outlets, bars and restaurants and was also to have a canal running the length of Bold Street. Development of the site was troubled, with delays caused by parties involved going into receivership and potential tenants pulling out. In September 2017, new owner Augur announced plans to develop the site while leaving space for the expansion of the station, potentially seeing new platforms built. Augur stated it had discussed its plans with Network Rail and Liverpool City Council, and hoped to have planning permission submitted during 2018.

Network Rail was scheduled to install an extra lift giving access to the Northern Line platforms in 2016/17. No work had begun by the end of 2016; the Transport Minister, Paul Maynard, confirmed that owing to funding issues, work would not start until 2019 at the earliest.

The Liverpool Echo published an article in October 2018 which claimed that unless the station was redeveloped to increase capacity it would be facing restrictions on passenger movement. Merseyrail managing director Andy Heath suggested that by the mid 2020s passengers could end up having to queue upstairs as the platforms would have insufficient capacity. Merseyrail chairman Cllr Liam Robinson stated that, due to the potential size of the works, Merseytravel were in discussions with the government over their plans to expand the station. Plans could include a new concourse and new platforms as well as making use of a previously constructed but unused tunnel portal to the east of the underground station.

Services 

Both lines on the Merseyrail network, the Northern Line and the Wirral Line, serve the station.

On the Northern Line, off-peak service level is as follows:
 4 trains per hour to 
 4 trains per hour to 
 4 trains per hour to 
 4 trains per hour to  via 

On Sundays, frequencies are reduced to 2 trains per hour on all routes.

On the Wirral Line, off-peak service level is as follows:
 4 trains per hour to 
 4 trains per hour to 
 4 trains per hour to 
 2 trains per hour to 

During the evening and on Sundays, frequencies are reduced to 2 trains per hour on all routes. These services are all provided by Merseyrail's fleet of Class 507 and Class 508 EMUs.

Northern Line Services use platforms 1 and 2 at the station. Usually trains to Kirkby and Hunts Cross depart from platform 1, and trains to Southport and Ormskirk use platform 2, although delays on the trains can cause these to change. All Wirral Line services depart from platform 3.

Northern to Wirral services 
Empty Coaching Stock (non-passenger) services have to reverse at Liverpool Central station, when going from Kirkdale Depot to Birkenhead North TMD and vice versa, making use of a single track chord known as the "Stock Interchange Line" linking Liverpool James Street station (Wirral Line) and Liverpool Central (Northern Line). No passenger services are scheduled to use the link, although it has seen very occasional use by charter trains. This was the route taken by Wirral Line trains between Central L.L & James Street prior to the building of the Link & Loop tunnels in the 1970s.

See also
List of underground stations of the Merseyrail network

References

Further reading

External links 

 History of Central station
Report by the Rail Accident Investigation Branch into 26 October 2005 derailment. (PDF format)

Central
Railway stations in Liverpool
DfT Category B stations
Former Mersey Railway stations 
Railway stations in Great Britain opened in 1892
Railway stations in Great Britain closed in 1975
Railway stations in Great Britain opened in 1977
Railway stations opened by British Rail 
Railway stations served by Merseyrail
Railway stations located underground in the United Kingdom